Johann Michael Winterhalder (7 September 1706, Vöhrenbach – 12 May 1759, Vöhrenbach) was a German artist in the Baroque style; from the  of sculptors.

Life and work
He was one of three sons born to the sculptor, . His training took place in his father's workshop, as it did for his older brothers, Anton (1699–1758) and Josef. In 1725, together with one of his father's apprentices, he set out on his Journeyman years. After spending some time in Gengenbach with his cousin, who was ill, they continued through Colmar, Augsburg and Munich, to Prague and Vienna.

In Vienna he made contact with the sculptor, Georg Raphael Donner, which would be significant to his career. From 1728 to 1730, he was a student at the Academy of Fine Arts; following Josef, who had attended the Academy the two years prior. From 1731 to 1732, all three brothers worked at the Hradisko Monastery, and at the pilgrimage church in Svatý Kopeček (today part of Olomouc).

This was to be their last joint project. Anton and Josef remained in Moravia. In 1733, Johann returned home to assist his overworked, eighty-year-old father. A year later, on the occasion of his marriage to Maria Scherzinger (1713–1749), the workshop became his. They had six children, two of whom, Josef and Anton (1745–1805), also became sculptors. Anton inherited the workshop when Johann died.

His best known projects include one that had been commissioned from his father in 1715, but never completed; twelve figures for the side altars at the Vöhrenbach parish . It was the first project he undertook after returning home. The original church was demolished in the 1950s, and the figures were loaned out or kept in an attic until the 1970s, when they were restored in the new church.

Later, the altar was remodeled to reflect the popular Rococo style, but his figures were left intact. They are among the few sculptures he created in stucco, rather than wood.

References

Further reading
Benno Griebert: Studien zur oberrheinischen Barockskulptur. Inaugural-Dissertation an der Philosophischen Fakultät der Friedrich-Wilhelms-Universität zu Berlin, 1935.
Manfred Hermann: Pfarrkirche St. Martin Vöhrenbach im Schwarzwald. Kunstverlag Josef Fink, Lindenberg ohne Jahr (1996?).

External links 

1706 births
1759 deaths
German sculptors
German woodcarvers
Academy of Fine Arts Vienna alumni
Religious sculptures
People from Schwarzwald-Baar-Kreis